Director is a 1969 Soviet drama film directed by Alexey Saltykov.

Plot 
The film takes place during the end of the civil war in Russia. The film tells about the sailor Alexey, who becomes the director of the automobile plant. He is trained by Ford in the United States, produces the first Soviet lorry and participates in the international rally in Kara-Kuma.

Cast 
 Nikolay Gubenko as Alexey Svorykin
 Svetlana Zhgun as Sanya Zvorykina
 Boris Kudryavtsev as Stepan Ruzayev
 Vladimir Sedov as Knyzh
 Anatoly Eliseev as Baraksin 
 Robert Daglish as American
 Vsevolod Shilovsky as Ptashkin  
 Bukhuti Zakariadze as Magarayev  (voiced by Yefim Kopelyan)
 Aleksey Krychenkov as Sukharik
 Valentina Berezutskaya as Fenochka
 Fyodor Odinokov as Ivan Kuzin

References

External links 
 

1969 films
1960s Russian-language films
Soviet drama films
1969 drama films
Mosfilm films
Films based on works by Yuri Nagibin

Films about industries
Soviet black-and-white films